"I Am the World" is a song recorded by the Bee Gees, written and sung by Robin Gibb. It was released as the B-side of "Spicks and Specks". Later, it was included on the compilation Rare, Precious and Beautiful, Vol. 3 in 1969. It featured trumpet played by Geoff Grant. Its CD version was released in 1998 on the compilation Brilliant from Birth.

Recording
It was the last recorded on the last month of Spicks and Specks sessions which was started in June until July 1966, recorded the same time as the title track. After this song, they recorded a number of songs which was later included on Inception/Nostalgia (1970). Trumpeter Geoff Grant recalls "I Am the World" along with four songs "Spicks and Specks", "All by Myself" and "The Storm" that he was working three nights recording that songs. It was one of the first songs to be written by Robin alone.

Personnel
 Robin Gibb — lead vocals
 Maurice Gibb — bass, piano, guitar
 Barry Gibb - guitar
 Colin Petersen — drums
 Geoff Grant — trumpet
 Uncredited musicians — horns

Robin Gibb version

Robin Gibb recorded his own version in 2008. It was released on his posthumous album 50 St. Catherine's Drive (2014). It was rewritten with Peter-John Vettese who produced the album. It was chosen as the album's first single released on 11 September 2014 and was added to BBC Radio 2 playlist.

In the UK, Reprise Records issued a promotional single of "I Am the World".

Cover versions
Johnny Young (a friend of the Gibbs) covered this song and used as the B-side of "Craise Finton Kirk Royal Academy of Arts" (the song was originally performed by the Bee Gees and first released on the album Bee Gees' 1st). Young's version was released by Polydor in the United Kingdom and Clarion Records in Australia in August 1967. 
 Bev Harrell covered "I Am the World" released as the B-side of "One Way Ticket" in October 1968.
 Canadian singer Renée Martel recorded a French-language cover of the song (as "Je suis la terre") in 1971, featured on her album Mon Roman D'Amour that year.

References

1966 singles
1966 songs
Bee Gees songs
Songs written by Robin Gibb
Robin Gibb songs
Polydor Records singles
1967 singles
Johnny Young songs
Spin Records (Australian label) singles
2014 singles
Song recordings produced by Peter-John Vettese